Defiance was a science fiction-themed persistent world massively multiplayer online third-person shooter developed by Trion Worlds. Defiance took place on a terraformed Earth several years into the future. It was a tie-in to the Syfy show of the same name. The game was released in April 2013 for Microsoft Windows, PlayStation 3 and Xbox 360. It was also released on Steam. The game went free-to-play on June 4, 2014 for PC, August 14, 2014 for PS3 and November 18, 2014 for Xbox 360. Official game servers, community forums, and social media outlets were shut down by owning company Gamigo on April 29, 2021.

Gameplay
Characters come from one of four Origins: Veterans, Outlaws, Machinists, or Survivalists. Veterans are a group of soldiers who survived The Pale Wars, a massive conflict between humans and aliens. Outlaws are criminals who raid and destroy for fortunes. Machinists are scavengers, who recover alien technology to make profits and a living from it. Survivalists are humans or aliens who attempt to survive in the newly formed, hostile world. Besides initial starter weapon and also costume - this choice, similar to Race (Human, Irathient, and Castithan) has no consequence in the later game, with all weapons, abilities and costumes being equally accessible to all players beyond the tutorial area.

Players can choose to be either a Human or an "Irathient" (a humanoid alien species who are similar to humans), or the Castithan race if they have particular downloadable content available.

The Ark Hunters are injected with an EGO (Environmental Guardian Online), a symbiotic, neuro-muscular bionetic implant developed by Von Bach Industries, which helps players navigate the Bay Area and gives them access to unique abilities.

Setting

The game takes place in the San Francisco Bay Area, 15 years after the devastating Pale Wars between Earth and a loose alliance of extraterrestrial races known as Votanis Collective.  The Votans came to Earth seeking a new home after the destruction of their solar system, unaware that the planet was already inhabited. Friction between the new arrivals and Humanity led to war, during which the Votan's terraforming technology was unleashed.  The Earth's surface was drastically altered as a result, introducing radical changes in topography, the extinction of plant and animal species, and the emergence of new species. Afterward, Humans and Votans were forced to live together. Player characters are enlisted as "Ark Hunters" by industrialist Karl Von Bach to search the Bay Area for advanced and expensive alien technology. Players also take part in side missions to earn cash or challenges in which they compete with other Ark Hunters.

Development
Defiance had been in development since August 2008. It started as a collaborative effort between Trion and Syfy to make a video game that ran alongside a television series. The publisher has reportedly spent more than $70 million during development.

The game's business model was changed from a paid game to a free-to play game on May 1, 2014 so as to introduce the game to a broader audience. Trion Worlds also added that they would consider the possibility of developing a port for PlayStation 4 and Xbox One once the consoles have a large player base.

In October 2015, Syfy announced that the Defiance show would be discontinued after the end of its third season, but Trion Worlds would continue to support the game after the show's cancellation. On March 1, 2016, Trion announced the "Dark Metamorphosis" update for the game, which was publicized as Season Four of Defiance.

Defiance 2050
In December 2017, Trion Worlds confirmed a Playstation 4 version of the game is in development. They also stated they had no plans of making a sequel, instead they will continue to update the game with new content. The new version, named Defiance 2050, came out on July 10, 2018 for PC, Xbox One, and PS4. It features the same map, story, missions, NPCs, enemies, sounds, HUD, and other assets from the first game; however, the four classes have been replaced with four new ones, each of which has its own EGO power tree. Many of the weapons were also replaced, weapon skills were consolidated, and some other minor tweaks were made. Cosmetic items that were purchased for the first game are automatically copied to Defiance 2050, but other items are not, including any items that players won from loot crates that were paid for with cash (like the Omec Respark Energizer V). Player characters cannot be transferred from the first game to the second. Like its predecessor, Defiance 2050 was free to play.

Server closure
On April 27, 2020, Gamigo announced on the official Defiance forums that the Defiance servers for Xbox 360 would be shut down on May 25, 2020 and the game would no longer be accessible. PC and PS3 servers would be unaffected by this shutdown. Any users who had an account for Defiance 2050 or wished to create one, would be given a one time special compensation and transfer benefit based on various in game progress factors and purchases on their accounts.

On February 24, 2021, Gamigo announced that both Defiance and Defiance 2050 will be shutting down April 29, 2021. On April 29, 2021 at 2:00 AM Pacific Standard Time Defiance and Defiance 2050 servers were shut down. The community forums and all official social media pages related to the Defiance franchise were also shut down within 24 hours.

Reception

The game received "mixed or average" reviews on all platforms according to the review aggregation website Metacritic.

411Mania gave the Xbox 360 version a score of seven out of ten and called it "a good foundation for a console MMO." The Digital Fix similarly gave it seven out of ten and said that it "settles into its rhythm very nicely and becomes a game that is so easily picked up and played you cannot help but fall for it a little." National Post gave the PlayStation 3 version a score of six out of ten, saying that it "seems simply to offer yet another big open world filled with weapons to collect and creatures to kill. I won’t deny that I’ve had moments of fun blowing holes in Hellbugs over the last week, but it was of a flavourless variety I could have derived from any number of other third-person shooters." The Escapist gave the same console version two-and-a-half stars out of five and called it "a middle-of-the road third-person shooter that never seems to fully capitalize on its alien-filled, post apocalyptic setting." Digital Spy gave it two stars out of five and said, "The potential is there for Defiance to be more than a half-decent console MMO marred by technical problems." Metro UK gave the Xbox 360 version a similar score of four out of ten and said, "A mix of low budget, (relatively) high ambition, and mediocre execution, Defiance is a hard game to hate but an easy one to lose interest in."

Notes

References

External links
 
 Defiance Wiki
 

Defiance (TV series)
Role-playing video games
Free-to-play video games
Massively multiplayer online games
PlayStation 3 games
Post-apocalyptic video games
Science fiction video games
Third-person shooters
Video games based on television series
Video games developed in the United States
Video games set in the 2040s
Video games set in San Francisco
Windows games
Xbox 360 games
2013 video games
Massively multiplayer online role-playing games
Persistent worlds
Gamebryo games
Human Head Studios games